Psycho may refer to:

Mind
 Psychopath
 Sociopath
 Someone with a personality disorder
 Someone with a psychological disorder

People with the nickname
 Karl Amoussou or Psycho, mixed martial artist
 Peter Ebdon or Psycho, English snooker player
 Steve Lyons (baseball) or Psycho, utility baseball player
 Jacob Noe or The Psycho, mixed martial artist
 Stuart Pearce or Psycho, English football player and manager
 Bull Pain or Psycho, American professional wrestler
 Psycho (wrestler), Japanese professional wrestler

Fictional characters 
 Psycho (Borderlands character), a type of enemy in the videogame Borderlands
 Sgt. Michael "Psycho" Sykes, a character in the videogame Crysis
 The Psycho, a character in the videogame Until Dawn
 Psycho Weasel, a character in the film Who Framed Roger Rabbit

Film 
 Psycho (franchise), an American horror thriller film franchise based on the Bloch novel
 Psycho (1960 film), a film by Alfred Hitchcock
 Psycho (1998 film), a remake of the original film by Gus Van Sant starring Vince Vaughn
 Psycho (2008 film)
 Psycho (2013 film)
 Psycho (2020 film)

Literature 
 Psycho (novel), a 1959 book by Robert Bloch
 Psycho (brand), a Japanese visual novel studio
 PsychoPublishing, an imprint of the German group VDM Publishing

Musical works
 The Psychos, a New York hardcore band
 Psycho (soundtrack), the soundtrack album to the 1998 remake of Psycho
 Psycho (album), an album by That's Outrageous!

Songs
 "Psycho" (Dixie D'Amelio song)
 "Psycho" (Lords of the Underground song)
 "Psycho" (Imelda May song)
 "Psycho" (Muse song)
 "Psycho" (Maisie Peters song)
 "Psycho" (Post Malone song)
 "Psycho" (Puddle of Mudd song)
 "Psycho" (Red Velvet song)
 "Psycho", by Anne-Marie and Aitch
 "Psycho", by Breaking Benjamin from Ember
 "Psycho", by Dave from Psychodrama
 "Psycho", by 50 Cent from Before I Self Destruct
 "Psycho", by iamnot from Whoami
 "Psycho", by Lower Class Brats
 "Psycho", by Leon Payne
 "Psycho", by Rebound!
 "Psycho", by Scooter from Back to the Heavyweight Jam
 "Psycho", by Soyeon, 2021
 "Psycho", by the Sonics
 "Psycho", by System of a Down from Toxicity
 "Psycho", by 12 Stones from Beneath the Scars

Other uses 
 Psychos (TV series), a British television drama broadcast in 1999
 Psycho Donuts, a donut store in Canada and Northern America
 Psychiatrist (game) or Psycho, a party game
 Psycho, a type of drug in the Fallout series of video games

See also 

 Syco, British entertainment company
 Psyco, a just-in-time compiler for the Python programming language
 Psy (disambiguation) 
 Psych (disambiguation)
 Psyche (disambiguation)
 Psychic (disambiguation)
 Psychedelic (disambiguation)